The Vice President of the Republic of Yemen is the second highest political position in Yemen. 

As of 7 April 2022, the role is fulfilled by the Deputy Chairmen of the Presidential Leadership Council.

Under the Constitution of Yemen, the Vice President is appointed by the President, and acts as constitutional successor of the President in case of a vacancy. The Vice President assists the President in his duties. The President may delegate some of his functions to the Vice President.

The position of the Vice President of Yemen was occupied by Yemen Army general Ali Mohsen al-Ahmar from 4 April 2016, after being appointed by the President Abdrabbuh Mansur Hadi.

On April 7, 2022, in a televised address, Hadi resigned, dismissed Vice President Ahmar, and transferred the powers of the President and Vice President to the Presidential Leadership Council, with Rashad al-Alimi, former Interior Minister under President Saleh, as its chairman. The council has seven deputy chairs, one of whom is the leader of the Southern Transitional Council, Aidarus al-Zoubaidi.

List of vice presidents of the Yemen Arab Republic (1977-1990)
This office was created in 1977.

List of Vice Presidents of the Republic of Yemen (1990–present)

References

Government of Yemen
Yemen
 
1990 establishments in Yemen